Pekwuteu is a former Yurok settlement in Humboldt County, California. It was located on the Lower Klamath River opposite town of Weitchpec, at an elevation of 348 feet (106 m).

References

Former settlements in Humboldt County, California
Former Native American populated places in California
Yurok villages